Baron Hamilton of Dalzell, in the County of Lanark, is a title in the Peerage of the United Kingdom. It was created in 1886 for the Liberal politician John Hamilton. He had previously represented Falkirk and Lanarkshire South in the House of Commons and after his elevation to the peerage served under William Ewart Gladstone as a Government Whip from 1892 to 1894. His eldest son, the second Baron, was a Government Whip from 1905 to 1911 in the Liberal administrations of Henry Campbell-Bannerman and H. H. Asquith and also served as Lord Lieutenant of Lanarkshire. His nephew, the third Baron, was Lord Lieutenant of Surrey.  the title is held by the latter's grandson, the fifth Baron, who succeeded his father in 2006.

The territorial designation is pronounced  as in the usual pronunciation of the Scottish surname.  The ancient family seat, Dalzell House in Motherwell, Lanarkshire, was sold in 1952. The third Baron lived in Bramley, Surrey. 

In 1980, James Hamilton, later to become the 4th Baron, inherited the Apley Hall estate of some 8,500 acres in Shropshire and the Betchworth estate in Surrey on the death of his cousin Major General E. H. Goulburn. The village hall at Betchworth is named the Hamilton Rooms after the family. As of 2004 the estate is divided into the land portion still owned by the current Duke.

Barons Hamilton of Dalzell (1886)
John Glencairn Carter Hamilton, 1st Baron Hamilton of Dalzell (1829–1900)
Gavin George Hamilton, 2nd Baron Hamilton of Dalzell (1872–1952)
John d'Henin Hamilton, 3rd Baron Hamilton of Dalzell (1911–1990)
James Leslie Hamilton, 4th Baron Hamilton of Dalzell (1938–2006)
Gavin Goulburn Hamilton, 5th Baron Hamilton of Dalzell (born 1968)

The heir apparent to the title is the Hon. Francis Alexander James Goulburn Hamilton (b. 2009), the present holder's son.

Baron Hamilton of Epsom
The Conservative politician Archie Hamilton, Baron Hamilton of Epsom (born 1941), is the second son of the third Baron Hamilton of Dalzell.

References

Work cited

Kidd, Charles, Williamson, David (editors). Debrett's Peerage and Baronetage (1990 edition). New York: St Martin's Press, 1990, 

Baronies in the Peerage of the United Kingdom
Noble titles created in 1886
Noble titles created for UK MPs